Herpetobotys is a genus of moths of the family Crambidae.

Species
Herpetobotys camerounensis Maes, 2001
Herpetobotys kenyensis Maes, 2001
Herpetobotys ugandae Maes, 2001

References

Spilomelinae
Crambidae genera